Ian Stuart (1967-2022) was a British fashion designer, noted for his wedding dress and occasion wear ranges.

A protégé of Bellville Sassoon, which count numerous socialites and the royal family as amongst their clients, he is based in Victoria, London. He has owned The Blewcoat in Westminster since 2002 and was part of a Channel 4 television series that featured one customer purchasing a gown from his store in each episode in 2018. 

Stuart won the Bridal Designer of the Year at the Bridal Buyer Awards in 2004, 2005, 2006, 2007, Outstanding Contribution to the Industry 2008, and UK Bridal Designer of the Year in 2010. His collections include Lady Luxe, Supernova, Frill Me, Killer Queen, Revolution Rocks!, Paramount and Belle Epoque.

References

External links
Official site 

Living people
British fashion designers
Wedding dress designers
Place of birth missing (living people)
1967 births